The Shirani Expedition was a British-Indian military expedition to the North-West Frontier Province in Pakistan.

References

Military expeditions
History of Pakistan
1853 in military history